Ruskin is an unincorporated community in Ware County, Georgia, United States. It lies between Waycross and Manor on U.S. Route 84. The community is part of the Waycross Micropolitan Statistical Area.

History
Ruskin was established in the 1890s, and was named after John Ruskin, a Victorian art critic. A post office called Ruskin was established in 1899, and remained in operation until 1932.

References

Unincorporated communities in Georgia (U.S. state)
Unincorporated communities in Ware County, Georgia
Waycross, Georgia micropolitan area